Yousef Ahmad Mohammad Al-Rawashdeh is a Jordanian footballer who plays for the Jordan national football team.

International career
Being born in the UAE, he was able to represent both Jordan and the UAE, which he chose the former. Yousef played his first match with his national senior team against Kuwait on 9 October 2013 in an international friendly at King Abdullah II Stadium in Amman, Jordan, which ended in a 1–1 draw.
Yousef scored his debut goal with his national senior team against Singapore during the qualifiers for the 2015 Asian Cup at Jalan Besar Stadium, in Kallang, Singapore on 4 February 2014. The match ended in a 3–1 win.

International goals

U-19 and U-23

Senior team
Scores and results list Jordan's goal tally first.

International career statistics

References

External links 

1990 births
Living people
Jordanian footballers
Jordan international footballers
Association football midfielders
2015 AFC Asian Cup players
Al-Arabi (Jordan) players
Al-Faisaly SC players
Al-Jazeera (Jordan) players
Al-Ramtha SC players
Dibba FC players
Mesaimeer SC players
Muaither SC players
Footballers at the 2010 Asian Games
2019 AFC Asian Cup players
UAE Pro League players
Qatari Second Division players
Expatriate footballers in the United Arab Emirates
Jordanian expatriate sportspeople in the United Arab Emirates
Expatriate footballers in Qatar
Asian Games competitors for Jordan